Lapuz is one of the seven districts of Iloilo City, in the Philippine province of Iloilo, on the island of Panay, in the Western Visayas. It is the smallest district by land area as well as the least populous district, with 31,747 people in the 2020 census. The Iloilo International Port Complex (IIPC) and the Iloilo Fastcraft & Roro Terminal are both located in Lapuz.

Etymology 
The name "Lapuz" is derived from its older name "Lapus-lapus", which came from the Hiligaynon word "lapus", which means "to insert/pass through" because of its location.

History
Lapuz was a part of the La Paz district ever since the latter was a town during the Spanish regime.

After several years of being a part of La Paz as a sub-district, Lapuz was made a separate district on December 17, 2008, after the Sangguniang Panglungsod (City Council) of Iloilo City passed a resolution for the district to have its own police station and fire station.

Barangays 
The district of Lapuz has 12 barangays.

See also

 Port of Iloilo

References

External links 

 Iloilo City Government Official Website

Districts of Iloilo City